Matthew Richardson (born 5 December 1984) is an English professional golfer played in both Europe and North America.

Richardson was a successful amateur golfer, with the pinnacle of his amateur career being an appearance in the 2005 Walker Cup. He turned professional later that year, and qualified for the European Tour at the end of 2006 via qualifying school. However, after a tough debut season, where he made only four cuts, Richardson moved to North America and began playing on the Canadian Tour. In 2009 he qualified for the second-tier Nationwide Tour, with a best finish of third in the Mexico Open. In 2010 Richardson qualified for his first professional major, the U.S. Open, and secured a return to the Nationwide Tour. He is also played on the PGA Tour Canada in 2012 and 2013.

Amateur wins
2002 Peter McEvoy Trophy, World Junior Championships
2004 European Amateur, Brabazon Trophy

Professional wins (1)

PGA EuroPro Tour wins (1)

Results in major championships

Note: Richardson never played in the Masters Tournament or the PGA Championship.

CUT = missed the half-way cut
"T" = tied

Team appearances
Amateur
European Boys' Team Championship (representing England): 2002
Jacques Léglise Trophy (representing Great Britain and Ireland): 2002 (winners)
European Youths' Team Championship (representing England): 2004
Eisenhower Trophy (representing England): 2004
St Andrews Trophy (representing Great Britain & Ireland): 2004 (winners)
European Amateur Team Championship (representing England): 2005 (winners)
Walker Cup (representing Great Britain & Ireland): 2005

See also
2006 European Tour Qualifying School graduates

References

External links

English male golfers
PGA Tour golfers
European Tour golfers
Sportspeople from Worcester, England
People from Hillingdon
People from Vaughan
1984 births
Living people